CJUM-FM (101.5 FM, UMFM) is a volunteer-driven campus radio station in Winnipeg, Manitoba, Canada, based at the University of Manitoba and transmits with 1,200 watts from an antenna located at Portage and Main in downtown Winnipeg.

History

The original CJUM, 1975–80
The station originally began broadcasting at 101.1 FM 6 a.n, October 27, 1975. CJUM-FM was one of the two first campus radio stations ever granted a broadcast licence in Canada, the other being Carleton University's CKCU-FM. However, the station faced financial difficulties, and closed down in June 1980. The original station signed off the air with Bruce Springsteen's "Born to Run". One reason the station closed down was due to the high cost of a BBM subscription.

Many of the staff and volunteers at CJUM-FM during this early period went on to successful careers in commercial and public broadcasting, including Steve Baidwan, Shelia Baptie, Rick Carter, Liz Clayton, Reid Dickie, Andy Frost, Marty Gold (Goldstein), Dale MacIntyre, Hugh Malcolmson, Howard Mandshein, Roman Onafrychuk, John Quinn, Chris Reichardt, Ron Robinson, and Les Siemieniuk.  At the time, CJUM-FM was renowned also for quality programming produced and hosted by local jazz aficionados—including its two hours of "Morning Jazz" every Monday through Friday—featuring the eclectic selections of such knowledgeable hosts as Raymond Alexander, Maury (Maurice) Bay, Danny Carroll, Neal Kimelman, Bill Mudge, and Kristen Templin, establishing the campus & community station as the "go-to" spot on the dial for Winnipeggers seeking jazz programs on the radio.

The revitalized CJUM, 1998–present
In the spring of 1996, a group of University of Manitoba students started a campaign to bring radio back to the campus. During a referendum that year, a $5 increase in student fees was sought, and passed with 2,520 votes for the levy, to go towards the construction and maintenance of this new station. The University of Manitoba Students' Union put forth an application to the Canadian Radio-television and Telecommunications Commission (CRTC) for a broadcasting licence, broadcasting at 101.5 MHz with effective radiated power of 1,200 watts was officially approved on October 2, 1997, and the station was reincarnated and began broadcasting on September 4, 1998 at 6:00 PM Central Daylight Time.

References

External links
UMFM
University of Manitoba Students' Union
 

Jum
Jum
University of Manitoba
Radio stations established in 1975
1975 establishments in Manitoba